Liberal Democratic Party is a political party of Thailand founded on 1 November 1955. Meth Rattanaprasit is leader and Boonkum Jansrisuriyawong is secretary-general and Jarubud Ruangsuwan is vice-secretary-general. In 26 February 1957 Liberal Democratic Party won in election. They won 11 seats. In 15 December 1957 Liberal Democratic Party won in election, they won 5 seats.

Party leadership

Past Leaders

General election results

References 

Defunct political parties in Thailand
1958 disestablishments
Nationalist parties in Asia
Liberal parties in Thailand